FEFSI Vijayan simply known as Vijayan is an Indian action choreographer, stunt coordinator, actor who works in Telugu, Tamil, Malayalam and Hindi language films. He has the record of being the youngest stunt master in the Indian film industry at the age of 22. He became a stunt man at the age of 17 due to family situation. He is the son of stunt choreographer Swaminathan who is known for composing Lion fight done by MGR in Adimai Penn. Swaminathan was a prominent fight master for MGR films & for that Vijayan had very close relationship with MGR. He was the president of the FEFSI and thus, earning him the nickname FEFSI Vijayan. His son, Shabarish is an actor who has starred in few films. 
During his heyday, he was widely touted as one of the best stunt coordinators of Bollywood and South Indian film industry.

Filmography

As stunt choreographer

 1981 Kolilakkam
 1981 Meendum Kokila
 1982 Sangili
 1983 Roshagadu (credited as Vijay)
 1983 Manthrigari Viyyankudu (credited as Vijay)
 1984 Bobbili Brahmanna
 1985 Chattamtho Poratam (credited as Vijay)
 1985 Agni Parvatam
 1985 Donga
 1985 Chiranjeevi
 1985 Vajrayudham
 1985 Adavi Donga
 1985 Mahaguru
 1985 Pattabhishekam
 1986 Kondaveeti Raja
 1986 Dharm Adhikari
 1986 Veta
 1986 Muddat
 1986 Khaidi Rudraiah
 1986 Apoorva Sahodarulu
 1986 Chanakya Sapatham
 1986 Kaliyuga Pandavulu
 1987 Collector Gari Abbai
 1987 Agni Putrudu
 1987 Ramu
 1987 Sahasa Samrat
 1987 Ajeyudu
 1987 Bharatamlo Arjunudu
 1988 Aakhari Poratam
 1988 Chinababu
 1988 Janaki Ramudu
 1988 Manchi Donga
 1988 Yuddha Bhoomi
 1988 Aswaddhama
 1988 Raktabhishekam
 1988 Brahma Puthrudu
 1989 Vicky Dada
 1989 Rakhwala
 1989 Agni
 1989 Bhale Donga
 1989 State Rowdy
 1989 Rudranetra
 1989 Kanoon Apna Apna
 1989 Prema
 1989 Ontari Poratam
 1989 Two Town Rowdy
 1990 Kondaveeti Donga
 1990 Lorry Driver
 1990 Bobbili Raja
 1991 Talli Tandrulu
 1991 Rowdy Alludu
 1991 Coolie No. 1
 1992 Dharma Kshetram
 1992 Gharana Mogudu
 1993 Muqabla
 1993 Kondapalli Raja
 1993 Nippu Ravva
 1994 Mugguru Monagallu
 1995 Alluda Majaka
 1995 Haathkadi
 1995 Big Boss
 1995 Pedarayudu
 1995 Ravan Raaj: A True Story
 1996 Jung
 1996 Akkada Ammayi Ikkada Abbayi
 1996 Soggadi Pellam		
 1998 Choodalani Vundi
 1999 Iddaru Mitrulu
 1999 Raja Kumarudu			 										
 2000 Bulandi
 2000 Vamsi
 2001 Mrugaraju 
 2001 Dhill 
 2002 Takkari Donga
 2002 Baba						
 2003 Okkadu   						
 2003 Gangotri
 2003 Simhachalam
 2003 Tagore
 2003 Joot
 2004 Arjun 						
 2004 Shankar Dada MBBS 						
 2005 Balu
 2005 Nuvvostanante Nenoddantana
 2005 Sachein
 2005 Subhash Chandra Bose
 2005 Political Rowdy
 2006 Pokiri
 2006 Unakkum Enakkum
 2006 Annavaram
 2007 Desamuduru
 2007 Pokkiri
 2007 Sri Mahalakshmi 						
 2007 Chirutha 						
 2007 Azhagiya Tamil Magan 						
 2008 Bujjigadu  						
 2009 Villu 						
 2009 Wanted						
 2010 Dabangg
 2010 Puli
 2010 Porki
 2011 Markandeyan 						
 2011 Bodyguard
 2012 Krishnam Vande Jagadgurum
 2013 Seethamma Vakitlo Sirimalle Chettu
 2014 Vallavanukku Pullum Aayudham
 2016 Brahmotsavam
 2017 Indrajith
 2017 Balakrishnudu
 2018 Bhaiaji Superhit
 2018 Bhaskar Oru Rascal

As actor

 1983 Mantri Gari Viyyankudu
 1988 Aakhari Poratam
 2001 Dhill
 2002 Baba 
 2002 Ivan
 2002 Villain 
 2003 Villain (Telugu) 
 2003 Tagore
 2003 Anjaneya
 2003 Joot
 2004 Aethiree
 2004 Giri
 2005 Sukran
 2005 Daas 
 2006 Jambhavan
 2006 Madrasi
 2008 Vambu Sandai
 2009 Villu 
 2009 Aadhavan
 2015 Inimey Ippadithaan
 2017 Muthuramalingam
 2019 Thadam
 2019 Devarattam

As director
 1991 Maha Yagnam - Telugu
 2004 Naani - Telugu (Heroine Introduction Scene only)
 2007 Sri Mahalakshmi - Telugu
 2011 Markandeyan - Tamil

Awards
Filmfare Awards
 2009: Filmfare Award for Best Action - Wanted 
 2010: Filmfare Award for Best Action - Dabangg 

Nandi Awards
 2001: Nandi Award for Best Fight Master - Bhadrachalam
 2002: Nandi Award for Best Fight Master - Takkari Donga
 2003: Nandi Award for Best Fight Master - Okkadu
 2006: Nandi Award for Best Fight Master - Pokiri
 2011: Nandi Award for Best Fight Master - Dookudu

References

External links 
 

Living people
Male actors in Telugu cinema
Indian male film actors
Indian action choreographers
21st-century Indian male actors
Telugu film directors
Tamil film directors
21st-century Indian film directors
Male actors in Tamil cinema
Year of birth missing (living people)